Gretel Killeen (born 3 February 1963) is an Australian comedian, television presenter, media personality and author. She is known for being the host of Big Brother Australia from its inception in 2001 until the 2007 season (including Celebrity Big Brother in 2002). Killeen hosted the 2009 TV Week Logie Awards.

Career

Television

Midday
From 1989 to 1991, Killeen was a regular on Midday with Ray Martin on the Nine Network. She wrote and featured in the sketch A Town Like Dallas, a parody of the genre of soap opera.

Coast to Coast
In 1990, Terry Willesee, John Mangos and Killeen hosted Coast to Coast for the Nine Network after the departure of Graham Kennedy from the program, but the program in the new format was short-lived.

Big Brother
Killeen was host of Big Brother Australia, from its first season in 2001. She hosted each series up until its seventh season in 2007.

On 28 October 2007, The Sunday Telegraph reported that, as a part of a revamp of the show, Killeen was being replaced as host by Kyle Sandilands and Jackie O from 2Day FM.

Other television roles
Killeen, along with Daniel MacPherson, co-hosted the Sydney New Year's Eve 2006–07 telecast and also the Australia Day eve celebrations on 25 January 2006. She was also the host of Ten's coverage of the Australia Day ceremony in 2007.

In 2009 Kileen hosted the Logies and was lowered onto the stage in an angel costume.

She played nurse Angela Mercie in two episodes of the YouTube web series The Horizon in 2013.

In 2015, Killeen co-hosted ABC TV series How Not to Behave with Matt Okine.

In 2019, Killeen appeared as a contestant on the Australian version of The Masked Singer as the Octopus, and was voted off in the first episode.

Killeen is a regular guest on morning/talk-shows such as; Studio 10, Sunrise, Today Australia and Today Extra Australia and The Project. Killeen has also appeared on Beauty and the Beast, Midday, SlideShow, Good Morning Australia, Celebrity Name Game, Q&A, Good News Week, You Have Been Watching and Talkin' 'Bout Your Generation.

Radio

Nova 100 
In 2003, Killeen filled in on Nova 100's Hughesy, Kate & Dave whilst Kate Langbroek was on maternity leave.

Literary works
As an author of a number of books,

Movie roles
Killeen has a cameo in the Australian film Gettin' Square as Rhonda Halliwell.

Stage roles
Killeen appeared as the Narrator in a stage production of The Rocky Horror Show in Sydney and Melbourne in 2008.

Personal life

Killeen was born in Sydney and has 2 adult children from a previous marriage.

Awards

Mo Awards
The Australian Entertainment Mo Awards (commonly known informally as the Mo Awards), were annual Australian entertainment industry awards. They recognise achievements in live entertainment in Australia from 1975 to 2016. Gretel Killeen won one award in that time.
 (wins only)
|-
| 2000
| Gretel Killeen
| Female Comedy Performer of the Year
| 
|-

References

External links

Gretel Killeen at Penguin Books

1963 births
Australian people of German descent
Australian stand-up comedians
Australian radio personalities
Australian women children's writers
Australian women radio presenters
Australian children's writers
Australian game show hosts
Big Brother (Australian TV series)
Living people
Comedians from Sydney
Australian women comedians